The BLK Art Group is the name associated with a group of five influential conceptual artists, painters, sculptors and installation artists based in the United Kingdom. Keith Piper, Marlene Smith, Eddie Chambers  Claudette Johnson and Donald Rodney were initially based in the English Midlands.

The group were all from the British African-Caribbean community and exhibited in 11 group exhibitions in both small and prestigious galleries throughout the country over a four year period from 1981 to 1984. Exhibiting under the title The Pan Afrikan Connection for their shows from the second show at Africa Centre in May 1982 to the 9th show, also at Africa Centre, 12 months later, their work was noted for its boldly political stance, producing dynamic conceptual art that offered a series of inventive critiques on the state of inter-communal, class and gender relations in the UK. They were themselves influenced by a variety of artistic currents including ideas associated with the USA's Black Arts Movement. Donald Rodney, who suffered from sickle cell anaemia (anemia), died aged 36 in 1998.

Precursors
In 1979, Eddie Chambers founded the group under the name Wolverhampton Young Black Artists. 

In 1981, Chambers curated the first of the group's exhibitions, Black Art & Done, at the Wolverhampton Art Gallery, which gave a focus to issues concerning the black community, including racial prejudice. Participating artists were Eddie ChambersDominic Dawes, Ian Palmer, Andrew Hazel and Keith Piper.

Institutional impact and legacy
The group exhibited in a total of eleven exhibitions, which they organised themselves. Shows from the second exhibition at the Africa Centre in May 1982 until their 9th (which was also at the Africa Centre) were titled The Pan-Afrikan Connection. The definitive list of shows for the group is as follows
1) Black Art & Done, Wolverhampton Art Gallery, June 1981
2) The Pan Afrikan Connection (TPAC), Africa Centre London 3rd May-4th Jun 1982
3)TPAC Ikon Gallery Birmingham 26 Jun - 19th Jul, 1982
4)TPAC Trent Polytechnic, Nottingham 25th-29th Oct 1982 
5)TPAC King Street Gallery, Bristol 17th-28th Nov 1982
6)TPAC Midlands Art Centre, Birmingham 7th Jan-3rd Feb 1983
7)TPAC Midlands Group, Nottingham 15th Jan-12th Feb 1983
8)TPAC Herbert Gallery, Coventry 20th Feb-20th Mar 1983
9)TPAC Africa Centre, London 3rd May-2nd Jun 1983
10)The Blk Art Group, Battersea Arts Centre, London (dates not verified)
11) Radical Black Art, Winterbourne House, University of Birmingham 6th Feb-1st Mar 1984 

Conferences organised by the group were: 
The First National Black Art Convention 26th October 1982 and 
Radical Black Art; a working convention 28th March 1984

Line Up;
Eddie Chambers and Keith Piper met in 1979 while studying on a Foundation Course at the then Lanchester Polytechnic, now Coventry University. Chambers was already preparing what would be the first group show, Black Art & Done which as well as Chambers & Piper included the work of Dominic Dawes, Andrew Hazel and Ian Palmer. Dawes also took part in the second of the group's exhibitions at Africa Centre in 1982 but Palmer & Hazel left the group. Claudette Johnson joined in 1981. She was a student at Wolverhampton School of Art and was also recruited by Chambers. She was active until the 8th show at Herbert Art Gallery. Marlene Smith and Donald Rodney were both recruited by Keith Piper, in 1982.  Rodney was a student at Nottingham Trent Polytechnic and Smith was a Foundation Student at then Birmingham Polytechnic, now Birmingham City University. Wenda Leslie and Janet Vernon were active from 1981 - 1983. Vernon was co chair of the First National Black Art Convention 
 
In 1988 Eddie Chambers curated the exhibition Black Art: Plotting the Course.

The group's critique of the institutional racism of Britain's art world was part of the impetus that led to The Other Story, a seminal survey of African and Asian artists curated by Rasheed Araeen at London's Hayward Gallery in 1989, as well as the founding of the Association of Black Photographers and the establishment of Iniva, the Institute of International Visual Art. Piper and Chambers themselves have both gone on to achieve veteran status as educators, writers and curators.

In 2011, the Blk Art Group Research Project was set up by Keith Piper, Claudette Johnson and Marlene Smith.

Critical appraisal

Eddie Chambers has argued that despite their undoubted creativity and social relevance, the group suffered from the general lack of serious critical attention given to black artists by the British arts media. Nevertheless, their enthusiasm and commitment to making art relevant to everyday life ensured that they were a strong influence on the later generation of black British artists that included Young British Artists (YBA) such as Chris Ofili and Steve McQueen, both of whom went on to win Turner Prizes, while maintaining a clear political element to their work.

Other artists associated with the BLK Art Group

  Faisal Abdu'allah - consequent
  David A. Bailey - contemporary
  Sonia Boyce - contemporary
  Denzil Forrester - contemporary
  Godfried Donkor - consequent
  Lubaina Himid - contemporary
  Tam Joseph - forerunner/contemporary
  Virginia Nimarkoh - contemporary
  Pitika Ntuli - forerunner/contemporary
  Eugene Palmer - contemporary
  Mark Sealy - contemporary
  Maud Sulter (1960–2008) - contemporary
  Fowokan - contemporary

See also
 Caribbean Artists' Movement

Further reading
 Julia Ann Paige Abraham, "Transformation and Defiance in the Art Establishment: Mapping the Exhibitions of The BLK Art Group (1981–1983)". Thesis, University of Birmingham.

References

External links 
 Blk Art Group Research Project 2012

 Leah Sinclair, "The BLK Art Group: how the West Midlands collective inspired the art world", Art UK, 12 August 2020.
 "BLK Art Group In-Conversation", Association for Art History, April 2021.

 Alex Mistlin, We were the AYBs – the angry young Blacks': the art movement that rocked Thatcher's Britain", The Guardian, 4 January 2022.

Black British artists
British artist groups and collectives